Fourmile Lake is a lake in South Dakota, in the United States.

Fourmile Lake was named from its distance,  from Fort Sisseton.

See also
List of lakes in South Dakota

References

Lakes of South Dakota
Lakes of Marshall County, South Dakota